Siemon is both a surname and a masculine given name, a variant of Simon. People with the name include:

Surname:
Gustav Siemon (1918–2011), German politician
Jeff Siemon (1950), former professional American football player
Uwe Siemon-Netto (1936), German international columnist
Given name:
Siemon Allen, South African contemporary artist
Siemon Muller (1900–1970), American paleontologist and geologist

German masculine given names
Surnames from given names